Here Come the Snakes is an album by the American alternative rock band Green on Red, released in 1989.

Production
Recorded in Memphis, the album was produced by Jim Dickinson and Joe Hardy. Band members Dan Stuart and Chuck Prophet were backed by local musicians. Stuart and Prophet used the Sam C. Phillips Recording Studio, where they worked with Roland Janes.

"We Had It All" is a cover of the song made popular in part by Keith Richards.

Critical reception

Trouser Press stated: "Again switching easily among rock, blues and country idioms, what’s left of Green on Red sounds relaxed and confident, a warm and boozy vehicle for Stuart’s amusingly wry regrets and social observations." Robert Christgau wrote that "Stuart reemerges on Jim Dickinson's shoulder as Neil Young and Mick Jagger fried into one bar singer."

The Chicago Tribune opined that "things bottom out on 'Tenderloin', a roiling, bluesy affair with a spoken monolog about failed love that, if it were delivered from a barstool by a tavern patron, would lead any saloonkeeper to close up early." The Vancouver Sun noted that "Stuart is still at the top of his art—it's just a little too disturbing for mass consumption." In 1990, The Times deemed Here Come the Snakes the best album of 1989, writing that Green on Red was "the most scandalously overlooked band of the last decade."

AllMusic wrote that "from the get-go, Prophet's guitar is the cornerstone to the Let It Bleed mood that fires this record."

Track listing

Personnel
Green on Red
Chuck Prophet - guitar, vocals
Dan Stuart - lead vocals, guitar
with:
René Coman - bass
Jim Dickinson - drums
Paul Ebersold - piano
Ed Kollis - harmonica 
The Zombie Choir - vocals

References

Green on Red albums
1989 albums
albums produced by Jim Dickinson
Restless Records albums